This is a comprehensive listing of official releases by Estonian pop-rock band Vanilla Ninja.

Albums

Studio albums

Compilation albums

Singles

Music videos

DVDs

References

External links 
 Vanilla Ninja Official Website

Discography
Discographies of Estonian artists
Rock music group discographies